2000 Egyptian League Cup, it was the first ever edition, participation first division teams only on voluntary basis.
Clubs play without international players (matches played during African Nations' Cup and Olympic qualifiers).
Ahly, Mansoura and El Ittihad Alexandria declined to participate.

Group stage

Group A

Group B

Knock-out stage

Bracket

Semifinals

|}

Ninth place play-off

|}

Seventh place play-off

|}

Fifth place play-off

|}

Third place play-off

Notes:

 Match ended 1–2, but the result was confirmed as 2–0 in favor of Ma'aden as a result of Suez used ineligible player.

Final

Final ranking

References

Egyptian League Cup
1999–2000 in Egyptian football